The 1964 Bromley Council election took place on 7 May 1964 to elect members of Bromley London Borough Council in London, England. The whole council was up for election and the Conservative party gained control of the council.

Background
These elections were the first to the newly formed borough. Previously elections had taken place in the Municipal Borough of Beckenham, Municipal Borough of Bromley, Chislehurst and Sidcup Urban District, Orpington Urban District and Penge Urban District. These boroughs and districts were joined to form the new London Borough of Bromley by the London Government Act 1963.

A total of 187 candidates stood in the election for the 60 seats being contested across 25 wards. These included a full slate from the Conservative and Labour parties, while the Liberals stood 56 candidates. Other candidates included 9 from the Communist party and 2 Independent Conservatives. There were 13 two-seat wards, 11 three-seat wards and 1 single-seat ward.

This election had aldermen as well as directly elected councillors.  The Conservatives got 7 aldermen, Labour 2 and the Liberals 1.

The Council was elected in 1964 as a "shadow authority" but did not start operations until 1 April 1965.

Election result
The results saw the Conservatives gain the new council with a majority of 16 after winning 38 of the 60 seats. Overall turnout in the election was 47.8%. This turnout included 1,803 postal votes.

Ward results

References

1964
1964 London Borough council elections